William Eugene Wright Jr. (born September 15, 1974) is an American basketball coach, currently head coach at Richmond High School in Richmond, Indiana. He was most recently head coach at Western Illinois University. He was recently hired by his high school alma mater Richmond High School to become the head coach of the men’s basketball team.

Wright played point guard at Richmond High School (where he led the team to an Indiana state title in 1992) and Bradley University.  Following the close of his playing career, Wright moved into coaching.  After coaching in the high school ranks for twelve years, he became an assistant coach at Western Illinois in 2008.  After a short stint at Ball State during the 2013–14 season, Wright was named head coach at Western Illinois on April 15, 2014. After Wright compiled a record of 53–115 during his six-year tenure, Western Illinois decided not to renew his contract.

On June 29, 2021 he was named head coach at his alma mater, Richmond High School.

Head coaching record

References

External links
Western Illinois Bio

1974 births
Living people
American men's basketball coaches
American men's basketball players
Ball State Cardinals men's basketball players
Basketball coaches from Indiana
Basketball players from Indiana
Bradley Braves men's basketball players
College men's basketball head coaches in the United States
High school basketball coaches in Indiana
Point guards
Sportspeople from Richmond, Indiana
Western Illinois Leathernecks men's basketball coaches